The 2011 ACC men's basketball tournament, a part of the 2010–11 NCAA Division I men's basketball season, took place from March 10 to March 13 at the Greensboro Coliseum in Greensboro, North Carolina. 

In contrast to the upset-heavy tournament in 2010 where the 11 and 12 seeds reached the semifinals, there were only two games in the first two rounds in which the lower seed prevailed.  Some notable games included the first round game between Miami and Virginia. The Cavaliers held a 10-point lead with 42 seconds left, but the Hurricanes scored 10 straight points at the end of regulation to send the game to overtime, where Miami eventually won. In the quarterfinal game between Florida State and Virginia Tech, the Hokies' Erick Green hit a shot to put Virginia Tech up 1 with 4.7 seconds left. Derwin Kitchen then hit what appeared to be the game-winning shot for the Seminoles, but the shot was waved off after review, and Virginia Tech advanced.

For the first time in 10 years, Duke and North Carolina played each other in the championship game. The top-seeded Tar Heels had come back from double-digit deficits in their victories against Miami and Clemson. Duke started strong as well, scoring the first 8 points and taking a 14-point lead at halftime. However, Duke did not relinquish their lead in the second half, as North Carolina never got closer than 9. Duke won, 75-58, to give the Blue Devils their 19th ACC championship, the most in ACC history. This title also tied Duke coach Mike Krzyzewski with former UNC coach Dean Smith for the most ACC championships, each having won 13.

Ticket policy
The ACC implemented a new ticket policy in hopes to sell out more of the Greensboro Coliseum's approximately 23,000 seats.  In previous years, each school was allotted an equal number of ticket books for distribution. This left large numbers of tickets unsold as some schools, such as Boston College, Miami, and Florida State, do not have large numbers of fans who make the trip to Greensboro for the tournament. In response, the ACC issued more ticket books to schools who traditionally sold the majority of their ticket books.

Seeding

Teams are seeded based on the final regular season standings, with ties broken under an ACC policy.

Schedule

Bracket

* Denotes Overtime Game

Awards and honors
Tournament MVP
Nolan Smith, Duke

All-Tournament Team

First Team
Nolan Smith, Duke
Kyle Singler, Duke
Harrison Barnes, North Carolina
Tyler Zeller, North Carolina
Demontez Stitt, Clemson

Second Team
Miles Plumlee, Duke
Seth Curry, Duke
John Henson, North Carolina
Kendall Marshall, North Carolina
Malcolm Delaney, Virginia Tech

References

Tournament
ACC men's basketball tournament
College sports in North Carolina
Basketball competitions in Greensboro, North Carolina
ACC men's basketball tournament
ACC men's basketball tournament